Elizabeth D. Leonard is an American historian and the John J. and Cornelia V. Gibson Professor of History at Colby College in Maine. Her areas of specialty include American women and the Civil War era.

Education 
She earned an M.A. in U.S. History in 1988 and a PhD in 1992 from the University of California Riverside.

Career 
Leonard has been teaching at Colby College since receiving her PhD, serving as an assistant, then associate professor from 1992 to 2003. She was interviewed in a C-Span special on the history of Augusta, Maine.

Leonard's research interests focus on the Civil War through the lens of gender (weighing in on controversial figures such as Loreta Janeta Velázquez) as well as race.
With the sesquicentennial of the Civil War, Leonard defended the scope of her scholarship in the Civil War era, arguing that there were prominent figures from the time about whom little is known.

Awards 
Between 2000 and 2003, Leonard was the Harriet S. and George C. Wiswell Jr. Research Fellow at Colby College in American History.

Her book, Lincoln’s Forgotten Ally: Judge Advocate General Joseph Holt of Kentucky won the Lincoln Prize in 2011.

Publications 
 Yankee Women: Gender Battles in the Civil War. New York: W.W. Norton, Sep 17, 1995. . 
 All the Daring of the Soldier: Women of the Civil War Armies. New York: W.W. Norton & Co., Jun 1, 1999. . 
 Lincoln's Avengers: Justice, Revenge, and Reunion After the Civil War. New York: W.W. Norton & Co., Mar 2004. . 
 Men of Color to Arms!: Black Soldiers, Indian Wars, and the Quest for Equality. New York: W.W. Norton & Co., Aug 23, 2010. . 
 Lincoln's Forgotten Ally: Judge Advocate General Joseph Holt of Kentucky (Civil War America series). Chapel Hill: University of North Carolina Press, Oct 10, 2011. . 
 Benjamin Franklin Butler: A Noisy, Fearless Life. Chapel Hill: The University of North Carolina Press, 2022. .

References

External links 
 
 Video of lecture 'Women in the Civil War' from Organization of American Historians's Youtube channel 

Living people
21st-century American historians
Colby College faculty
Historians of the American Civil War
University of California, Riverside alumni
Lincoln Prize winners
Year of birth missing (living people)
Historians of Abraham Lincoln